Koura District (from )  is a district in the North Governorate, Lebanon.

Koura is one of the 26 districts of Lebanon, particularly known for its olive tree cultivation and olive oil production. It comprises a total of 52 villages, and its capital and largest town is Amioun, with about 10,000 inhabitants as of 2010. 
The district stretches from the Mediterranean Sea up to Mount Lebanon, and comprises a series of foothills surrounding a low-lying plain where olive is cultivated. The olive orchards of Koura are among the most extensive in Lebanon.

72% of Koura's inhabitants belong to the Greek Orthodox confession, while the rest are split between Maronites, Sunni Muslims, Shia Muslims and a small Alawite minority. It is the only majority Greek Orthodox district in Lebanon.

The University of Balamand is headquartered in the Koura District.

Cities and towns
Kfaraakka
Amioun
Enfeh
Deddeh
Kousba
Kfaraakka
Ras Maska

See also
University of Balamand

References

 
Districts of Lebanon
North Governorate